Ila (Chiila) is a language of Zambia.  Maho (2009) lists Lundwe (Shukulumbwe) and Sala as distinct languages most closely related to Ila.  Ila is one of the languages of the Earth included on the Voyager Golden Record.

Orthography

 ch in fact varies from "k" to a "weak" version of English "ch", to a "strong" "ch" to "ty".
 j as the voiced sound corresponding to this therefore varies "g"/English "j"/ "dy" / and "y".
 v is reportedly a voiced labiodental fricative /v/ as in English , and vh the same labialised and aspirated /vʷʰ/ ("lips more rounded with a more distinct emission of breath").
 zh is the voiced post-alveolar fricative /ʒ/; French  as in bonjour.
 ng is the voiced velar nasal followed by a voiced velar plosive, /ŋg/ as in RP English "finger", while ng'  is a plain voiced velar nasal /ŋ/ as in "singer" - a similar distinction is observed in Swahili.

Labio-glottal and palato-glottal fricatives
Doke (1928) described several unusual doubly articulated consonants in Ila proper, Kafue Twa and Lundwe.

In Ila proper,  are "modified glottal fricatives in which the air passes through the throat with considerable friction, and is modified by being thrown against the toothless ridge and inside of the upper lip, causing concomitant frication there. ... The tongue is meanwhile kept in velar vowel position as for [u] and these fricatives therefore inherently possess a u-glide, which is noticeable when they are used with any other vowel than u." The 'concomitant lip frication' is evidently something like that of [f] and [v]. Doke transcribed these sounds simply .

Lundwe and Kafwe Twa have a palato-glottal fricative . "This sound is produced with a tongue position similar to Ila  but with considerable voiced frication in the throat at the same time."

Tonality and stress

Tone is demonstrated by contrasting aze with high pitch on the first syllable ( = "with him") with aze with high pitch on the second syllable (= "he also").

Some words and phrases

 ing'anda - house
 imboni - pupil of the eye
 ipeezhyo - brush;broom
 indimi - tongues
 lemeka - honour (verb)
 bamba - arrange
 Bamambila - they arrange for me
 Balanumba - they praise me
 bobu buzani - this meat
 Bobu mbuzani - this is meat
 chita - to do, same is used to mean 'I have no idea'
 chisha - to cause to do
 katala - to be tired
 katazhya - to make tired
 ukatazhya-refuse to be sent;scarce
 impongo - a goat

Some comparisons

 Ila: ishizhyi - dimness; Sotho: lefifi - darkness; Xhosa: "ubufifi" - dimness; Nyanja: chimfifi - secret;
Bemba: IMFIFI - darkness; Kisanga: mfinshi - darkness; and Bulu (Ewondo): "dibi" - darkness.

Ideophones or imitation words

Words in English such as "Splash!", "Gurgle", "Ker-putt" express ideas without the use of sentences. Smith and Dale  point out that this kind of expression is very common in the Ila language:

You may say Ndamuchina anshi ("I throw him down"), but it is much easier and more trenchant to say simply Ti!,  and it means the same.

Some examples:

 Muntu wawa - A person falls
 Wawa mba - falls headlong
 Mba! - He falls headlong
 Mbo! mbo! mbo! mbò! - (with lowered intonation on the last syllable) He falls gradually
 Mbwa! - flopping down, as in a chair
 Wa! wa! wa! wa!- The rain is pattering
 Pididi! pididi! pididi! - of a tortoise, falling over and over from a great height
 Ndamuchina anshi - I throw him down
 Ti! - ditto
 Te! - torn, ripped
 Amana te! - The matter's finished
 To-o! - So peaceful!
 Wi! - All is calm
 Ne-e! - All is calm
 Tuh! - a gun going off
 Pi! - Phew, it's hot!
 Lu! - Yuck, it's bitter!
 Lu-u! - Erh, it's sour!
 Lwe! - Yum, sweet!
 Mbi! - It's dark
 Mbi! mbi! mbi! mbi! - It's utterly dark
 Sekwè sekwè! - the flying of a goose
 nachisekwe - a goose

Class prefixes

As in many other languages, Ila uses a system of noun classes. Either the system as presented by Smith and Dale  is simpler than that for Nyanja, ChiChewa, Tonga, or Bemba, or the authors have skated over the complexities by the use of the category "significant letter":

 Class 1. singular: prefix: mu-; s/l. (= "significant letter" verb, adjective, etc. prefix appropriate to the class:) u-, w-
 Class 1. plural. prefix: ba-; s/l. b-
 Class 2. sing. prefix: mu-; s/l. u-, w-
 Class 2. pl. prefix: mi-; s/l. i-, y-
 Class 3. sing. prefix: i-, di-; s/l. l-, d-
 Class 3. pl. prefix: ma-; s/l. a-
 Class 4. sing. prefix: bu- abstract nouns; s/l. b-
 Class 4. pl. prefix: ma-; s/l. a-
 Class 5. sing. prefix: ku- often nouns of place; s/l. k-
 Class 5. pl. prefix: ma-; s/l. a-
 Class 6. sing. prefix: ka- a diminutive sense; s/l. k-
 Class 6. pl. prefix: tu- diminutive plural; s/l. t-
 Class 7. sing. prefix: chi- "thing" class; s/l. ch-
 Class 7. pl. prefix: shi-; s/l. sh-
 Class 8. sing. prefix: in-; s/l. i-, y-
 Class 8. pl. prefix: in-; s/l. y-, sh-
 Class 9. sing. prefix: lu-; s/l. l-
 Class 9. pl. prefix: in-; s/l. y-, sh-
 Class 10. sing. prefix: lu-; s/l. l-
 Class 10. pl. prefix: ma-; s/l. a-

The locatives form a special category:
 mu- - at rest in, motion into, motion out from;
 ku- - position at, to, from
 a- - rest upon, to or from off (Compare pa- prefix in Sanga, etc.)

Thus:
 Mung'anda mulashia - The inside of the house is dark.
 Kung'anda kulashia - Around the house it is dark.
 Ang'anda alashia - Darkness is upon the house.

The Ila verb system

The root is the part of the verb giving the primary meaning. To this can be added prefixes and suffixes: many elements can be united in this way, sometimes producing long and complex polysyllabic verb words. For example, from the root anga, "to tie",
we can derive such a form as Tamuna kubaangulwila anzhyi? meaning, "Why have you still not untied them?"

Prefixes can show:
 tense
 subject
 object
 voice (exceptional)

Suffixes can show:
 voice
 tense (exceptional)
 mood

Here are some of the forms of the verb kubona, "to see". (Note that there are also negative forms, e.g. ta-tu-boni, "we do not see", that there is also a subjunctive mood, a conditional mood, a jussive mood and the imperative. Many subjunctive forms end in -e.

The root of the verb is in two forms:

 (i) simple stem: bona : code - SS
 (ii) modified stem: bwene : code ₴
 -SS              tubona          we (who) see
 -₵               tubwene         we (who) have seen
 -A-SS            twabona         we saw, see, have seen
 -A-CHI-SS        twachibona      we continue seeing
 -A-YA-BU-SS      twayabubona     we are engaged in seeing
 -DI-MU-KU-SS     tudmukubona    we are seeing
 -CHI-SS          tuchibona       we continue to see
 -LA-SS           tulabona        we are constantly (usually, certainly) seeing
 -LA-YA-BU-SS     tulayabubona    we are being engaged in seeing
 -LA-YA-KU-SS     tulayakubona    we are habitually in the act of seeing
 -DI-₵            tulibwene       we have seen
 -CHI-₵           tuchibwene      we have been seeing
 -A-KA-SS         twakabona       we saw
 -A-KA-CHI-SS     twakachibona    we continued seeing
 -A-KA-YA-BU-SS   twakayabubona   we were engaged in seeing
 KA-SS            katubona        (Notice the position of tu here) we saw
 KA-₵             katubwene       we did see
 -A-KU-SS         twakubona       we were seeing
 -A-KU-CHI-SS     twakuchibona    we were continuing to see
 -A-KU-YA-BU-SS   twakuyabubona   we were engaged in seeing
 -A-KU-₵          twakubwene      we had seen
 -KA-LA-SS        tukalabona      we shall soon see
 -KA-LA-CHI-SS    tukalachibona   we shall continue seeing
 -KA-LA-YA-BU-SS  tukalayabubona  we shall be engaged in seeing

The above English renderings are approximate.

Certain suffixes add new dimensions of meaning to the root. Although these follow some logic, we again have to feel a way towards an adequate translation into English or any other language:

 simple verb: bona - to see
 relative or dative form: -ila, -ela, -ina, -ena: bonena - to see to, for somebody, and so on
 extended relative: ilila, -elela, -inina, enena: bonenena - to see to, for somebody, etc. ililila - to go right away
 causative: -ya + many sound changes: chisha - to cause to do, from chita - to do
 capable, "-able": -ika, -eka: chitika - to be do-able
 passive: -wa: chitwa - to be done
 middle (a kind of reflexive that acts upon oneself - compare Greek): -uka: anduka - to be in a split position, from andulwa- to be split by somebody
 stative; in fixed constructions only: -ama: lulama - to be straight; kotama - to be bowed
 extensive: -ula: sandula - turn over; andula - split up
 extensive, with the sense of "keep on doing": -aula: andaula - chop up firewood
 equivalent of English prefix "re-": -ulula: ululula - to trade something over and over again, from ula - to trade
 or the equivalent of the English prefix "un-", also: -ulula: ambulula - to unsay, to retract
 reflexive - a prefix this time - di- : dianga - to tie oneself, from anga - to tie; dipa - to give to each other, from pa - to give
 reciprocal: -ana: bonana - to see each other
 intensive: -isha: angisha - to tie tightly
 reduplicative:  - keep on turning aside, from ambuka - to turn aside

These can be used in composites: e.g. langilizhya - to cause to look on behalf of.

Oral literature

A text given by Smith and Dale, Sulwe Mbwakatizha Muzovu ("How Mr. Hare managed to scare Mr. Elephant") presents what might be called a "classical fabliau", with animals talking like people, just as in the Fables of Aesop or the Brer Rabbit stories in the African Diaspora. Is it fanciful to see the model for the mischievous, resourceful Brer Rabbit in the Sulwe of this story? It seems that slaves destined for the southern United States were captured and purchased in this area of Zambia. There is at least a statistical possibility that the Brer Rabbit cycle, with its use of ideophones or sound imitations, had an origin in the Ila language.

Bibliography
Smith, Edwin William & Dale, Andrew Murray, The Ila-speaking Peoples of Northern Rhodesia.  Macmillan and Company, London, 1920.

References

External links 
Dorothea Lehmann, Folktales from Zambia: Texts in six African languages and in English, Lubuto Library Special Collections, accessed May 4, 2014.
OLAC resources in and about the Ila language
OLAC resources in and about the Sala language

Languages of Zambia
Botatwe languages
Library of Congress Africa Collection related